Utah's 21st State Senate district is located in Davis County and includes Utah House Districts 11, 13, 14, 15 and 16. The current State Senator representing the 21st district is Jerry Stevenson. Stevenson was elected by delegates to replace Sheldon Killpack after Killpack's resignation in January 2010.  Stevenson is up for re-election in November 2022 after winning the 2018 Election.

Previous Utah State Senators (District 21)

Election results

2018 General Election

2014 General Election

2010 General Election

2004 General Election

See also

 Utah Democratic Party
 Utah Republican Party
 Libertarian Party of Utah
 Utah Senate

References

External links
 Utah Senate District Roster
 Official Biography of Jerry W. Stevenson

21